Indigo is the ninth studio album by American singer and songwriter Chris Brown, released on June 28, 2019, by RCA Records. The album marks his second double album and serves as a follow-up to his eighth album Heartbreak on a Full Moon (2017). Brown enlisted and worked with several producers, including Smash David, Soundz, Hitmaka, Boi-1da, Scott Storch, OG Parker and many others. The album features various guest appearances by urban and pop artists, including Nicki Minaj, G-Eazy, Tory Lanez, Tyga, Justin Bieber, Juicy J, Juvenile, H.E.R, Tank, Lil Jon, Lil Wayne, Joyner Lucas, Gunna, Trey Songz and Drake.

The official recording sessions for the album began in August 2018 and ended in May 2019, with some songs being recorded earlier during the first months of 2018, while a couple songs from the extended edition were recorded a few years prior. The album's aesthetics feature a supernatural and spiritual imagery, conceived by Brown himself, and handled by graffiti artist Saturno, visual artist Jeff Cole, and 3D artists Circle Circle Math and Sarper Baran.

The album debuted at number one on the US Billboard 200, making it his third number-one album in the country, and first in seven years, since Fortune (2012). Six official singles were released from Indigo: "Undecided", "Back to Love", "Wobble Up", featuring Nicki Minaj and G-Eazy, "No Guidance", featuring Drake, and "Heat", featuring Gunna. "No Guidance" became the biggest hit from the album, peaking at number 5 on the Billboard Hot 100, and topping the Rhythmic Airplay chart, until being unseated by the following released single, "Heat", at the top spot.

Background and recording
In December 2017, soon after releasing his first double-disc, Heartbreak on a Full Moon, Brown started to work on new material. Later in the beginning of 2018 he worked on two collaboration mixtapes, that ended up never being released, one with R&B singer Jacquees, and another one with rapper Joyner Lucas, while still working on new songs for his next solo project, that was rumored to be called Indigo.

The actual processing work of the project, after the drafting of its concept, began in August 2018, at the end of the "Heartbreak On A Full Moon tour", with "Undecided" being the first song composed following the idealization of the album, while a couple songs from the extended edition, dropped 3 months after the actual album, were composed during the realization of the previous album Heartbreak on a Full Moon, with the song "Technology" made in 2016, and the song "Going At It" in December 2017. The album was fully recorded and mixed at Calabasas Sound in Los Angeles, with the exception of "Undecided", being recorded and mixed at Brown's home studio, named CBE Studios.

Prior to its release the singer said that Indigo would focus on "energy, love, light, and happiness", saying that it reminded him of his previous albums Chris Brown, Graffiti and F.A.M.E.. Brown explained the album's title during an Instagram live, saying:

Music and lyrics 
Indigo is an R&B album, which tends to a slightly more pop sound than its predecessor Heartbreak on a Full Moon, containing as well genres such as dancehall and afrobeat. The album's sound in parts contains influences of tropical music, where songs with percussionist sounds from genres like dancehall, afropop and bounce music prevail, as in songs like "You Like That", "Juice", "Wobble Up", "Back to Love" and "Lurkin'".

On the disc there are 4 double tracks, where there's a progression of different musical productions, and they are "Emerald/Burgundy", "Natural Disaster/Aura", "Trust Issues/Act In" and "BP/No Judgment".
 
Indigos topics outline a positive turn that follows a bad period in a person's life, represented as the calm after the storm. In many parts of the album the singer describes how love, in his many forms, connects him to the enlightment of his spirituality. According to A.D. Amorosi of The Inquirer, the album's themes mix spiritual awakening with sexuality. Indigo, being the follow-up of Heartbreak on a Full Moon, leaves the raw and personal songwriting of that album, as well as its dark and sultry mood, for a way more lighthearted sound and tone, still having few introspective songs like "All on Me" and "Don't Check on Me" that give a closer look at Brown's trials and tribulations.

Artwork
The cover art for the album was revealed on May 14, 2019, along with the back cover. The front cover artwork was designed by graffiti artist Saturno and features a purple-haired Chris Brown's face in space, surrounded by fictional monsters and flying saucers, while the back cover, designed by visual artist Jeff Cole, continues the supernatural theme with a levitating body over a pyramid. The CD's interior illustrations were handled by 3D artists and concept designers Circle Circle Math and Sarper Baran, that worked over a photoshoot done by Jake Miosge, Brown's official tour photographer.

Release and promotion
In December 2017, Brown showed that he was working on new songs teasing a "Michael Jackson-inspired" song on his Instagram profile, filming a video from his studio and playing the song supposedly called "Vampire Vibe". During the first months of 2018 he posted some snippets of new unreleased songs, showing that he was working on a collaboration mixtape with Jacquees, on another collaboration mixtape with Joyner Lucas, and on his album, rumored to be called Indigo.

In January 2019, Brown announced a new deal with International global media and his label RCA Records, becoming one of the youngest artists to own his masters at age 29. Indigo was announced as the first album on this deal, with the release of the first single "Undecided" on January 4, 2019. Three days later Brown stated in an Instagram post that his new album would not be as lengthy as Heartbreak on a Full Moon.

He later previewed and released the second official single from the album, "Back to Love", on April 11, 2019, getting a positive response from fans and critics. The following week he released the third single from the album, "Wobble Up", featuring Nicki Minaj and G-Eazy, announcing that the album would be released in June, also confirming a summer tour with Nicki Minaj, that ended up never happening. In an announcement made on May 2, 2019, Brown announced the list of artists he had been working with for the album, including Tory Lanez, Sage the Gemini, Tyga, Justin Bieber, Juicy J, Juvenile, H.E.R, Tank, Lil Jon, Lil Wayne, Joyner Lucas, Gunna and Drake. Some of these collaborations were surprising to the media, especially Drake, due to their public feud that lasted for several years. Two days later he said that Indigo would be a 30-track album, in reference to his 30th birthday.

During Brown's birthday party on May 5, 2019, the singer previewed some songs from the album, and announced its release for June 21, 2019, later admitting a possible postponement to a week later, on June 28. He later revealed the artwork of the album and its track list between May and June 2019. On June 8, Brown released "No Guidance" featuring Drake as a single. It debuted at number nine on the US Billboard Hot 100, making it Chris Brown's 15th top-ten song, and becoming his highest-charting song as a lead artist since 2013's "Loyal" as well.

Indigo was released on June 28, 2019. In August he hinted an upcoming deluxe version of the album, confirming it on September 27. On October 4, 2019, Brown released an expanded version of Indigo entitled Indigo Extended, which included 10 additional songs, making the extended version a total of 42 songs.

In January 2020 Brown announced on his Instagram profile that the album was about to get a "mini movie" visual version. Later on March 9, 2020 he confirmed its working posting a short video snippet of futuristic graphics accompanied by the song "Red". He captioned the video with "INDIGO MOVIE STARTS PRODUCTION SOON". However the mini movie ended up never happening, with speculations that it didn't because of the starting of COVID-19 pandemic.

Tour

On June 10, 2019, Chris Brown announced an official headlining concert tour where he performed the album throughout United States, titled "Indigoat Tour". The tour began on August 20 in Portland, Oregon, at Moda Center, and ended on October 19 in Anaheim, California, at the Honda Center. The opening acts for the tour were Tory Lanez, Ty Dolla $ign, Joyner Lucas and Yella Beezy.

Reception
Jay Cridlin of Tampa Bay Times said that the concert was "a guilty pleasure", wondering if supporting his unique talent should be wrong after the mistakes that he's done, expressing "At what point do we -- can we, should we -- forget about the blowups and restraining orders, and just marvel at the way Brown splits into a backflip and kick-spins a 360 during Drunk Texting?".

The tour was considered a big success, grossing over $30,100,000 in its 37 shows, selling out most of the venues, and being the third most successful hip-hop tour of 2019, after Travis Scott's "Astroworld – Wish You Were Here Tour" and Eminem's "Rapture 2019"

Critical reception

Trent Clark stated in the title of his review that, "“Indigo is a publicity stunt that needs a cease and desist" and found that "Listening to 32 songs straight through is a chore. Of course, all trespasses would be forgiven if Indigo was this era’s Trap&B Thriller but Brown, whose applauded prolificness hasn’t been behind a Billboard Hot 100 No. 1 hit since 2007, opts to be the chaser instead of the creator." Clark pointed out that "There are aimless love ballads like anticlimactic ender “Play Catchup” or overwrought “You Like That” which bleed genericness", and that "there are reaches for commercial fodder that come off half-baked". Despite this, he also said that "The good side of the coin offers some positive counterbalance, however... Overtop a dreamy soundscape of chimes and hypnotic drums, Brown and H.E.R. harmonize their bones perfectly on the romantic “Come Together.” The buoyant “Troubled Waters” softens the mood deep into the album as the metaphor for being a lifeguard of love funnels rather nicely. And although it doesn’t meet the level of its celebrity expectations, the Drake-featured “No Guidance” serves as a timeless bluesy groove that most importantly, seals the coffin on a particularly nasty feud." Clark ended the review and found the album was "...the whiteboard of ideas and nobody bothered to find the dry eraser." and gave the album a 2.9 out of 5. 

Andy Kellman of AllMusic gave the album two and a half stars out of five, and stated that while the album "allows more than enough space for the singer to sufficiently cover each one of his modes, that "On his own, Brown tends to tread water" and that "All of the referenced classics... are handled clumsily." 

Awards and nominations

Commercial performance
In the United States, Indigo debuted at number one on the US Billboard 200 with 108,000 album-equivalent units, which included 28,000 pure album sales in its first week, making it his third number-one album in the country. The album also accumulated 97.95 million on-demand audio streams in the United States for its track list of 32 songs. In its second week, the album remained in the top ten and fell to number three, earning just under 50,000 album-equivalent units. In its third week, the album dropped to number five on the chart, earning 42,000 album-equivalent units that week. Just over a month after its release, Indigo generated over 1 billion streams.  On December 9, 2019, the album was certified platinum by the Recording Industry Association of America (RIAA) for combined sales and album-equivalent units of over a million units in the United States. Indigo became Chris Brown's longest-running album on the Billboard 200, spending over 100 weeks on the chart.

In Australia, the album opened at number three on the ARIA Albums Chart, becoming Brown's sixth top-ten album in the country. In the United Kingdom, the album debuted at number seven on the UK Albums Chart, Brown's seventh top-ten album on the chart.

Track listing
Credits adapted from the album's liner notes and Tidal.https://listen.tidal.com/album/112118323|title=Indigo / Chris BrownNotes  signifies a co-producer
  signifies an additional producer
  signifies an uncredited co-producer
  signifies an uncredited additional producer
 "Let's Smoke" was not included on streaming versions of the album internationally nor on Apple Music in the US; thus the track listing was cut down to 32 songs (42 including the Extended Edition)
 "Indigo" features uncredited background vocals by Tank
 "Trust Issues" features uncredited vocals by Sage the Gemini
 "Juice" features background vocals by Tone Stith
 "Undecided" features background vocals by Felicia FerraroSample credits "Come Together" contains a sample from "Don't Stop", written by Albert Hudson, as performed by One Way.
 "Temporary Lover" contains a sample from "I Want To Thank You", written by Kevin McCord, as performed by Alicia Myers.
 "Emerald" contains a portion of the composition "Drag Rap (Triggerman)", written by Orville Hall, and Phillip Price, as performed by the Showboys.
 "All I Want" contains a sample from "How's It Goin' Down", written by Anthony Fields, and Earl Simmons, as performed by DMX.
 "Wobble Up" contains samples from "Monkey on the D$CK", written by Renetta Lowe, and Byron Thomas, as performed by Magnolia Shorty and "Wishing on a Star ("Dancin" Danny D Remix)", written by Billie Calvin, as performed by Fresh Four.
 "Need a Stack" contains a portion of the composition "Back That Azz Up", written by Dwayne Carter, Terius Gray, and Byron Thomas, as performed by Juvenile.
 "No Guidance" contains an uncredited sample from "Before I Die", written and performed by Che Ecru.
 "Sorry Enough" contains a sample from "Grindin'", written by Charles Hugo, Gene Thornton, Terrance Thornton, and Pharrell Williams, as performed by Clipse.
 "Undecided" contains a sample from "I Love Your Smile", written by Jarvis Barker, Sylvester Jackson, Shanice Knox, and Narada Walden, as performed by Shanice.
 "Throw It Back" contains a sample from "Back & Forth", written by Robert Kelly, George Clinton III, George Clinton, Jr., William Collins, Garry Shider, David Spradley, Bernard Worrell, and Philippé Wynn, as performed by Aaliyah.
 "Let's Smoke" contains a sample from "Back Pocket", written by Jack Stratton, as performed by Vulfpeck.
 "Troubled Waters" contains a sample from "Get Me Back on Time (Engine Number 9)", written and performed by Wilson Pickett.
 "Early 2K" contains an interpolation of "Beep", performed by Bobby V, "Chillin' on the Westside", performed by Boo-Yaa T.R.I.B.E., "It Wasn't Me", performed by Shaggy, Buy U a Drank (Shawty Snappin'), performed by T-Pain, "Let Me Love You", performed by Mario, "U Remind Me" and Lay You Down, performed by Usher, "Maybe I Deserve" and "Slowly", performed by Tank, "Peaches & Cream", performed by 112, "In Those Jeans", performed by Ginuwine, "Crazy in Love", performed by Beyoncé, "Bed", performed by J. Holiday, "So Gone", performed by Monica, and "What About Us", performed by Brandy.

Personnel
Credits adapted from the album's liner notes and Tidal.Instrumentation Lee England Jr - violin 
 Happy Perez – guitar 
 Xeryus Gittens – guitar 
 Todd Norman – percussion 
 Nicholas Carter – percussion 
 Isaac Wriston – bass 
 Johnathan Smith – keyboards 
 Angelo Arce – keyboards 
 Michael Washington – keyboards 
 Ervin Garcia – guitar 
 Giancarlo "EVO" Evola - guitar Technical Patrizio Pigliapoco – recording , mixing 
 Josh Gudwin – recording , mixing 
 Samuel Kalandjian – recording 
 Michael "Crazy Mike" Foster – recording for Juicy J 
 Christian "CQ" Quinonez – recording and mixing for Tyga 
 Aubry "Big Juice" Delaine – recording and mixing for Nicki Minaj 
 Dakarai – recording and mixing for G-Eazy 
 Matthew Testa – recording for Lil Wayne 
 Brian Eisner – recording for Joyner Lucas 
 Noel Cadastre – recording for Drake 
 Josh Gudwin – recording and mixing for Justin Bieber 
 Ruben Rivera – recording for Tank 

 Noah "40" Shebib – mixing 
 Chris Athens – mastering 
 Randy Merrill – mastering 
 Sauce Miyagi – engineering 
 Ben "Bengineer" Chang – engineering assistant 
 Sourwavez – engineering assistant 
 Ashley Jackson – engineering assistant 
 Brian Chew – engineering assistant 
 Elijah Marett-Hitch – engineering assistant 
 Todd Robinson – additional engineering 
 Omar Loya – vocal engineering for H.E.R. 
 Miki Tsutsumi – vocal engineering for H.E.R. 
 Alex Pyle – vocal engineering assistant for H.E.R. Managerial'
 Chris Brown – creative direction
 Courtney Walter – creative direction, art direction, design
 Miosge – creative direction, photography
 Saturno – cover illustration
 Jeff Cole – back cover illustration
 Circle Circle Math – inside illustrations
 Sarper Baran – inside illustrations

Charts

Weekly charts

Year-end charts

Decade-end charts

Certifications

References

2019 albums
Chris Brown albums
Albums produced by Allen Ritter
Albums produced by Boi-1da
Albums produced by Cardiak
Albums produced by Dem Jointz
Albums produced by Frank Dukes
Albums produced by Hitmaka
Albums produced by J. R. Rotem
Albums produced by Keyz (producer)
Albums produced by Kiddominant
Albums produced by Noah "40" Shebib
Albums produced by RoccStar
Albums produced by Scott Storch
Albums produced by Vinylz
RCA Records albums
Bounce music albums